Bruce Kozerski (born April 2, 1962) is a former American football center who played twelve seasons with the Cincinnati Bengals in the National Football League. He graduated from James M. Coughlin High School in Wilkes-Barre, Pennsylvania. He graduated from the College of the Holy Cross in Worcester, MA with a major in Physics and later acquired a Master's in teaching from Xavier University. He was an alternate in the 1988, 1989, and 1990 Pro Bowls. "Mr. Versatile", as he was called, retired after the 1995 season. He is a teacher at Holy Cross High School in Covington, Kentucky where he teaches physics, pre-calculus, and calculus. He is also the head football coach at Holy Cross as well. He lives in Edgewood, Kentucky.

On November 25, 2011, Kozerski, in his eighth year as head coach, led Holy Cross High School's Covington football team to the Kentucky High School Athletic Association Division 2A, state football championship. It was the Indians' first appearance in the state championship game. Holy Cross defeated Glasgow High School 33-14 in the championship game.

References

1962 births
Living people
American football offensive linemen
Players of American football from Pennsylvania
Cincinnati Bengals players
Holy Cross Crusaders football players
College of the Holy Cross alumni
Ed Block Courage Award recipients